Marius Iulian Doboș (born 29 December 1980) is a Romanian footballer who plays as a midfielder for Liga IV side Dinamo Bacău. In his career, Doboș also played for teams such as FCM Bacău, FC Vaslui or Aerostar Bacău, among others.

Career at FCM Bacau & SC Vaslui

External links
 
  
 FCM Bacău Facebook Page 
 Online Newspaper 
 BacauSport  
 Sports Blog 

1981 births
Living people
Romanian footballers
Association football midfielders
Liga I players
Liga II players
FCM Bacău players
FC Vaslui players
CS Aerostar Bacău players
Sportspeople from Bacău